The Seilbahn Zugspitze is an aerial tramway running from the Eibsee Lake to the top of Zugspitze in Bavaria, Germany. Construction of the system began in 2015 and it opened on 22 December 2017.

This cable car replaced the original Eibsee Cable Car which closed on 2 April 2017 leaving no service for eight and a half months (access to Zugspitze was still possible via the rack railway and the Gletscherbahn Cable Car).

History 

The cable car from Lake Eibsee was built to provide a faster access to the Zugspitze from its German side, as the rack railway from Garmisch-Partenkirchen does not go directly to the summit and takes much longer. Both the original Eibsee Cable Car and its replacement Seilbahn Zugspitze belong to Bayerische Zugspitzbahn Bergbahn AG, the company operating the rack railway and most cable cars, gondola lifts and chairlifts in the Garmisch-Partenkirchen area. It is thus possible to make round trips using both the rack railway and the cable car. On the Austrian side, there is the Tyrolean Zugspitze Cable Car which starts at Ehrwald and meets the Seilbahn Zugspitze at the top.

Technical 

The technical details of the Eibsee Cable Car and the replacement Seilbahn Zugspitze are summarised in the following table.

Incidents 

On 12 September 2018, during an emergency training exercise, the chain of the chain hoist used to lower the rescue vehicle onto the running ropes broke dropping the vehicle onto the ropes before the hoisting rope could be attached. As both the rescue vehicle and the gondola were empty during the exercise, nobody was hurt. The gondola was damaged beyond repair (there is no information on the fate of the rescue vehicle, but there is no indication that a replacement is required).

The tramway remained closed until a replacement gondola was available. It reopened on 21 December 2018. It is not possible to operate the system with one gondola as each gondola counter-balances the other. Installing a temporary counter-weight would necessitate recertification of the system. This was a previously unknown failure scenario and has required other similar aerial tramway systems to review their safety assessments. In particular: to devise a method by which the rescue vehicle is restrained while being lowered onto the running ropes rather than afterwards.

See also 
 Bavarian Zugspitze Railway

References

External links
 Description and pictures on Seilbahngeschichte.de (German)
 
 

Cable cars in Germany
1963 establishments in Germany